Another Woman's Husband is a 2000 television movie starring Gail O'Grady, Lisa Rinna, Dale Midkiff, Sally Kirkland, Charlotte Rae, Bob Larkin, Amzie Strickland and Carroll Baker. It was directed by Noel Nosseck and written by Anna Tuttle Villegas and Lynne Hugo.

External links
 
 
 

2000 films
2000 television films
2000 drama films
Films scored by Mark Snow
American drama television films
2000s English-language films
Films directed by Noel Nosseck
2000s American films